St John's Church, today known as Shangxiang Christian Church, is a Protestant church situated on Shangxiang Street in the city of Chengdu, Sichuan Province. Founded in 1909, it was originally an Anglican church in the Diocese of Western China (also, Diocese of Szechwan).

History 

At the close of 1891, the Rev J H Horsburgh of the Church Missionary Society (CMS) of Church of England, along with other missionaries, entered Sichuan as the first band of CMS missionaries to take up work in that province.

The Diocese of West China was established in 1895, and William Cassels, one of the Cambridge Seven, became the first diocesan bishop, ordained by the Archbishop of Canterbury (Edward White Benson). In 1909, Cassels purchased a land near Xishuncheng Street, in Chengdu, for building the Fu Jen School. After the school's closure in 1926, a chapel was added to the building, and a second storey added in 1939. The building had completed its conversion from a school into a church, and renamed St John's.

The church was bombed in World War II. In 1946, the plan of building a large chapel in front of the church was unsuccessful, but it was restored and communal worship services resumed shortly after. In 1954, the communist government established the 'self-governance, self-support, and self-propagation' Three-Self Patriotic Church, Christian Churches in China were forced to sever their ties with respective overseas Churches, which has thus led to the merging of St John's into Three-Self Church.

In 1992, the church was demolished, in order to support a street extension project. Reconstruction was completed in 2011. The new church is built in the fusion of neo-Gothic and Minimalist architectural styles, and is the largest Protestant church building in Chengdu.

See also 
 Anglicanism in Sichuan
 Gospel Church, Mianyang
 Gospel Church, Wanzhou
 St John's Cathedral, Langzhong
 Sï-Shen-Tsï Methodist Church, Chengdu
 :Category:Former Anglican churches in Sichuan

References 

20th-century Anglican church buildings
20th-century churches in China
Churches in Chengdu
Chengdu
Rebuilt churches
Chengdu